Zillmann may refer to:

People
 Dolf Zillmann (born 1935), Polish-American Professor of Information Sciences, Communication and Psychology at the University of Alabama
 Johann Leopold Zillmann (1813–1892), German missionary to Australia
 Karoline Zillmann (born 1985), German long track speed skater
 Katarzyna Zillmann (born 1995), Polish rower, Olympic medalist

Other uses
 Großer Zillmann Lake, Mecklenburg-Vorpommern, Germany
 Lake of Kleiner Zillmann, Mecklenburg-Vorpommern, Germany

 Meister Zillmann (Master Zillmann), a 1965 novel by Herbert Nachbar

See also
 Zillman